The black-chested tyrant (Taeniotriccus andrei) is a species of bird in the family Tyrannidae. It is found in Brazil, Suriname, and Venezuela. It is placed in the monotypic genus Taeniotriccus by most ornithologists, although it has formerly been in the genus Poecilotriccus.

Its natural habitat is subtropical or tropical moist lowland forests.

References

black-chested tyrant
Birds of Venezuela
Birds of Brazil
black-chested tyrant
Taxonomy articles created by Polbot